The 2019 Singapore Open (officially known as the Singapore Badminton Open 2019) was a badminton tournament which took place at Singapore Indoor Stadium in Singapore from 9 to 14 April 2019 and had a total purse of $355,000.

Tournament
The 2019 Singapore Open was the tenth tournament of the 2019 BWF World Tour and also part of the Singapore Open championships, which had been held since 1929. This tournament was organized by the Singapore Badminton Association with sanction from the BWF.

Venue
This international tournament was held at Singapore Indoor Stadium in Singapore.

Point distribution
Below is the point distribution table for each phase of the tournament based on the BWF points system for the BWF World Tour Super 500 event.

Prize money
The total prize money for this tournament was US$355,000. Distribution of prize money was in accordance with BWF regulations.

Men's singles

Seeds

 Kento Momota (champion)
 Chou Tien-chen (semi-finals)
 Viktor Axelsen (semi-finals)
 Chen Long (quarter-finals)
 Son Wan-ho (withdrew)
 Srikanth Kidambi (quarter-finals)
 Anthony Sinisuka Ginting (final)
 Tommy Sugiarto (first round)

Finals

Top half

Section 1

Section 2

Bottom half

Section 3

Section 4

Women's singles

Seeds

 Tai Tzu-ying (champion)
 Nozomi Okuhara (final)
 Akane Yamaguchi (semi-finals)
 P. V. Sindhu (semi-finals)
 Ratchanok Intanon (quarter-finals)
 Saina Nehwal (quarter-finals)
 Sung Ji-hyun (quarter-finals)
 Sayaka Takahashi (first round)

Finals

Top half

Section 1

Section 2

Bottom half

Section 3

Section 4

Men's doubles

Seeds

 Marcus Fernaldi Gideon / Kevin Sanjaya Sukamuljo (semi-finals)
 Li Junhui / Liu Yuchen (semi-finals)
 Takeshi Kamura / Keigo Sonoda (champions)
 Mohammad Ahsan / Hendra Setiawan (final)
 Hiroyuki Endo / Yuta Watanabe (second round)
 Kim Astrup / Anders Skaarup Rasmussen (quarter-finals)
 Han Chengkai / Zhou Haodong (first round)
 Fajar Alfian / Muhammad Rian Ardianto (quarter-finals)

Finals

Top half

Section 1

Section 2

Bottom half

Section 3

Section 4

Women's doubles

Seeds

 Yuki Fukushima / Sayaka Hirota (semi-finals)
 Misaki Matsutomo / Ayaka Takahashi (second round)
 Mayu Matsumoto / Wakana Nagahara (champions)
 Shiho Tanaka / Koharu Yonemoto (withdrew)
 Jongkolphan Kititharakul / Rawinda Prajongjai (quarter-finals)
 Ayako Sakuramoto / Yukiko Takahata (quarter-finals)
 Nami Matsuyama / Chiharu Shida (quarter-finals)
 Chang Ye-na / Jung Kyung-eun (first round)

Finals

Top half

Section 1

Section 2

Bottom half

Section 3

Section 4

Mixed doubles

Seeds

 Zheng Siwei / Huang Yaqiong (semi-finals)
 Yuta Watanabe / Arisa Higashino (first round)
 Dechapol Puavaranukroh / Sapsiree Taerattanachai (champions)
 Chan Peng Soon / Goh Liu Ying (quarter-finals)
 Tang Chun Man / Tse Ying Suet (second round)
 Goh Soon Huat / Shevon Jemie Lai (second round)
 Hafiz Faizal / Gloria Emanuelle Widjaja (semi-finals)
 He Jiting / Du Yue (first round)

Finals

Top half

Section 1

Section 2

Bottom half

Section 3

Section 4

References

External links
 Tournament Link
 Official Website

Singapore Open (badminton)
Singapore Open
Singapore Open (badminton)
Singapore Open (badminton)